Grigori Petrovich Guz (born 5 January 1985) is a former Russian professional football player.

Club career
He played in the Russian Football National League for FC Angusht Nazran in the 2013–14 season.

External links
 
 

1985 births
Living people
Russian footballers
Association football midfielders
FC Energiya Volzhsky players
FC Sibir Novosibirsk players
FC Angusht Nazran players
PFC Spartak Nalchik players
FC Mashuk-KMV Pyatigorsk players